James Pirri is an American actor and fight choreographer best known for voice acting Angelo Bronte in Rockstar Studios' Red Dead Redemption 2 and is also known for playing Tori Vega's dad on the Nickelodeon show Victorious. He also voiced Boozer in Days Gone.

Career
Pirri studied theatre at the University of Colorado, although he was an engineering major. He had roles in the 1987 Colorado Shakespeare Festival and played Guildenstern in the 1988 Colorado Shakespeare Festival production of Hamlet.

He has also worked on many of Dan Schneider's shows, first as Mario on an episode of iCarly, second as André on an episode of Zoey 101, as well as the recurring David Vega in Victorious. He has also appeared on several other TV shows, such as Disney Channel's Shake It Up as a recurring character named Uncle Frank, as well as appearances on CSI: Crime Scene Investigation, Chuck, The O.C., Friends, and 3rd Rock From the Sun. Pirri also voiced the character Rais, the main antagonist of Dying Light.

In 2016, he voiced Commander Akeel Min Riah in Call of Duty: Infinite Warfare.

In 2018, he voiced Angelo Bronte, an Italian crime boss, in Red Dead Redemption 2.

In 2019, he voiced William (Boozer) Gray best friend of Deacon St. John, in Days Gone.

In 2020, he joined The Owl House cast as the voice of Alador Blight.

Filmography

Films

Television

Video games

References

External links
 

American male voice actors
University of Colorado alumni
Living people
20th-century American male actors
Place of birth missing (living people)
American male stage actors
American male television actors
American male video game actors
21st-century American male actors
American male film actors
Year of birth missing (living people)